Field hockey at the 2010 Summer Youth Olympics was held at the Sengkang Hockey Stadium in Singapore.

Medalists

Results

Preliminaries

Classification matches

Fifth place match

Bronze-medal match

Gold-medal match

Goalscorers

References
Pool matches summary
Classification summary

Field hockey at the 2010 Summer Youth Olympics